Art Nouveau is an international style of art, architecture, and applied art, especially the decorative arts. The style is known by different names in different languages:  in German,  in Italian,  in Catalan, and also known as the Modern Style in English. It was popular between 1890 and 1910 during the Belle Époque period, and was a reaction against the academic art, eclecticism and historicism of 19th century architecture and decoration. It was often inspired by natural forms such as the sinuous curves of plants and flowers. Other characteristics of Art Nouveau were a sense of dynamism and movement, often given by asymmetry or whiplash lines, and the use of modern materials, particularly iron, glass, ceramics and later concrete, to create unusual forms and larger open spaces.

One major objective of Art Nouveau was to break down the traditional distinction between fine arts (especially painting and sculpture) and applied arts. It was most widely used in interior design, graphic arts, furniture, glass art, textiles, ceramics, jewellery and metal work. The style responded to leading 19-century theoreticians, such as French architect Eugène-Emmanuel Viollet-le-Duc (1814–1879) and British art critic John Ruskin (1819–1900). In Britain, it was influenced by William Morris and the Arts and Crafts movement. German architects and designers sought a spiritually uplifting Gesamtkunstwerk ("total work of art") that would unify the architecture, furnishings, and art in the interior in a common style, to uplift and inspire the residents.

The first Art Nouveau houses and interior decoration appeared in Brussels in the 1890s, in the architecture and interior design of houses designed by Paul Hankar, Henry van de Velde, and especially Victor Horta, whose Hôtel Tassel was completed in 1893. It moved quickly to Paris, where it was adapted by Hector Guimard, who saw Horta's work in Brussels and applied the style for the entrances of the new Paris Métro. It reached its peak at the 1900 Paris International Exposition, which introduced the Art Nouveau work of artists such as Louis Tiffany. It appeared in graphic arts in the posters of Alphonse Mucha, and the glassware of René Lalique and Émile Gallé.

From Belgium and France, Art Nouveau spread to the rest of Europe,  taking on different names and characteristics in each country (see Naming section below). It often appeared not only in capitals, but also in rapidly growing cities that wanted to establish artistic identities (Turin and Palermo in Italy; Glasgow in Scotland; Munich and Darmstadt in Germany), as well as in centres of independence movements (Helsinki in Finland, then part of the Russian Empire; Barcelona in Catalonia, Spain).

By 1914, and with the beginning of the First World War, Art Nouveau was largely exhausted. In the 1920s, it was replaced as the dominant architectural and decorative art style by Art Deco and then Modernism. The Art Nouveau style began to receive more positive attention from critics in the late 1960s, with a major exhibition of the work of Hector Guimard at the Museum of Modern Art in 1970.

Naming 
The term Art Nouveau was first used in the 1880s in the Belgian journal L'Art Moderne to describe the work of Les Vingt, twenty painters and sculptors seeking reform through art. The name was popularized by the Maison de l'Art Nouveau ("House of the New Art"), an art gallery opened in Paris in 1895 by the Franco-German art dealer Siegfried Bing.

Art Nouveau is related to, but not identical with, styles that emerged in many countries in Europe at about the same time. Their local names were often used in their respective countries to describe the whole movement.

 In Britain, besides Art Nouveau, it was known as the Modern Style, or, because of works of Glasgow School, as the Glasgow style. 
For painting, the name of the Mir Iskusstva ("World of Art") movement was also used.
In Finland, it was also called .
 In Italy, it was often called Liberty style, after Arthur Lasenby Liberty, the founder of London's Liberty & Co, whose textile designs were popular.
 In the United States, due to its association with Louis Comfort Tiffany, it was sometimes called the "Tiffany style".
 In Portugal, .
 In Spain, Modernisme (in Catalan) and Arte joven ("Young Art").
 In Switzerland, Style Sapin ("Fir tree style").
 In Japan, Shiro-Uma.
 In Romania, Arta 1900 ("1900 Art"), Arta Nouă ("New Art") or Noul Stil ("New Style").

History

Origins 

The new art movement had its roots in Britain, in the floral designs of William Morris, and in the Arts and Crafts movement founded by the pupils of Morris. Early prototypes of the style include the Red House with interiors by Morris and architecture by Philip Webb (1859), and the lavish Peacock Room by James Abbott McNeill Whistler. The new movement was also strongly influenced by the Pre-Raphaelite painters, including Dante Gabriel Rossetti and Edward Burne-Jones, and especially by British graphic artists of the 1880s, including Selwyn Image, Heywood Sumner, Walter Crane, Alfred Gilbert, and especially Aubrey Beardsley. The chair designed by Arthur Mackmurdo has been recognized as a precursor of Art Nouveau design.

In France, it was influenced by the architectural theorist and historian Eugène Viollet-le-Duc, a declared enemy of the historical Beaux-Arts architectural style, whose theories on rationalism were derived from his study of medieval art:
 Function should define form.
 Unity of the arts and the abolition of any distinction between major art (architecture) and minor arts (decorative arts).
 Nature's logic is the model to be used for architecture.
 Architecture should adapt itself to man's environment and needs.
 Use of modern technologies and materials.
Viollet-le-Duc was himself a precursor of Art Nouveau: in 1851, at Notre-Dame de Paris, he created a series of mural paintings typical of the style. These paintings were removed in 1945 as deemed non academic. At the Château de Roquetaillade in the Bordeaux region, his interior decorations dating from 1865 also anticipate Art Nouveau. In his 1872 book Entretiens sur l'architecture, he wrote, "Use the means and knowledge given to us by our times, without the intervening traditions which are no longer viable today, and in that way we can inaugurate a new architecture. For each function its material; for each material its form and its ornament." This book influenced a generation of architects, including Louis Sullivan, Victor Horta, Hector Guimard, and Antoni Gaudí.

The French painters Maurice Denis, Pierre Bonnard and Édouard Vuillard played an important part in integrating fine arts painting with decoration. "I believe that before everything a painting must decorate", Denis wrote in 1891. "The choice of subjects or scenes is nothing. It is by the value of tones, the coloured surface and the harmony of lines that I can reach the spirit and wake up the emotions." These painters all did both traditional painting and decorative painting on screens, in glass, and in other media.

Another important influence on the new style was Japonism. This was a wave of enthusiasm for Japanese woodblock printing, particularly the works of Hiroshige, Hokusai, and Utagawa Kunisada, which were imported into Europe beginning in the 1870s. The enterprising Siegfried Bing founded a monthly journal, Le Japon artistique in 1888, and published thirty-six issues before it ended in 1891. It influenced both collectors and artists, including Gustav Klimt. The stylized features of Japanese prints appeared in Art Nouveau graphics, porcelain, jewellery, and furniture. Since the beginning of 1860, a Far Eastern influence suddenly manifested. In 1862, art lovers from London or Paris, could buy Japanese artworks, because in that year, Japan appeared for the first time as an exhibitor at the International Exhibition in London. Also in 1862, in Paris, La Porte Chinoise store, on Rue de Rivoli, was open, where Japanese ukiyo-e and other objects from the Far East were sold. In 1867, Examples of Chinese Ornaments by Owen Jones appeared, and in 1870 Art and Industries in Japan by R. Alcock, and two years later, O. H. Moser and T. W. Cutler published books about Japanese art. Some Art Nouveau artists, like Victor Horta, owned a collection of Far Eastern art, especially Japanese.

New technologies in printing and publishing allowed Art Nouveau to quickly reach a global audience. Art magazines, illustrated with photographs and colour lithographs, played an essential role in popularizing the new style. The Studio in England, Arts et idèes and Art et décoration in France, and Jugend in Germany allowed the style to spread rapidly to all corners of Europe. Aubrey Beardsley in England, and Eugène Grasset, Henri de Toulouse-Lautrec, and Félix Vallotton achieved international recognition as illustrators.
With the posters by Jules Chéret for dancer Loie Fuller in 1893, and by Alphonse Mucha for actress Sarah Bernhardt in 1895, the poster became not just advertising, but an art form. Sarah Bernhardt set aside large numbers of her posters for sale to collectors.

Development – Brussels (1893–1898) 

The first Art Nouveau town houses, the Hankar House by Paul Hankar (1893) and the Hôtel Tassel by Victor Horta (1892–1893), were built almost simultaneously in Brussels. They were similar in their originality, but very different in their design and appearance.

Victor Horta was among the most influential architects of early Art Nouveau, and his Hôtel Tassel (1892–1893) in Brussels is one of the style's landmarks. Horta's architectural training was as an assistant to Alphonse Balat, architect to King Leopold II, constructing the monumental iron and glass Royal Greenhouses of Laeken. He was a great admiror of Viollet-le-Duc, whose ideas he completely identified with. In 1892–1893, he put this experience to a very different use. He designed the residence of a prominent Belgian chemist, Émile Tassel, on a very narrow and deep site. The central element of the house was the stairway, not enclosed by walls, but open, decorated with a curling wrought-iron railing, and placed beneath a high skylight. The floors were supported by slender iron columns like the trunks of trees. The mosaic floors and walls were decorated with delicate arabesques in floral and vegetal forms, which became the most popular signature of the style. In a short period, Horta built three more town houses, all with open interiors, and all with skylights for maximum interior light: the Hôtel Solvay, the Hôtel van Eetvelde (for Edmond van Eetvelde), and the Maison & Atelier Horta. All four are now part of a UNESCO World Heritage Site.

Paul Hankar was also an innovator of early Art Nouveau. Born at Frameries, in Hainaut, the son of a master stone cutter, he had studied ornamental sculpture and decoration at the Royal Academy of Fine Arts in Brussels from 1873 to 1884, whilst working as an ornamental sculptor. From 1879 to 1904, he worked in the studio of the prominent architect Henri Beyaert, a master of eclectic and neoclassical architecture. Through Beyaert, Hankar also became an admirer of Viollet-le-Duc. In 1893, Hankar designed and built the Hankar House, his own residence in Brussels. With a goal to create a synthesis of fine arts and decorative arts, he brought together the sculptor René Janssens and the painter Albert Ciamberlani to decorate the interior and exterior with sgraffiti, or murals. The facade and balconies featured iron decoration and curling lines in stylised floral patterns, which became an important feature of Art Nouveau. Based on this model, he built several houses for his artist friends. He also designed a series of innovative glass display windows for Brussels shops, restaurants and galleries, in what a local critic called "a veritable delirium of originality". He died in 1901, just as the movement was beginning to receive recognition.

Henry van de Velde, born in Antwerp, was another founding figure in the birth of Art Nouveau. Van de Velde's designs included the interior of his residence in Brussels, the Bloemenwerf (1895). The exterior of the house was inspired by the Red House, the residence of writer and theorist William Morris, the founder of the Arts and Crafts movement. Trained as a painter, Van de Velde turned to illustration, then to furniture design, and finally to architecture. For the Bloemenwerf, he created the textiles, wallpaper, silverware, jewellery, and even clothing, that matched the style of the residence. Van de Velde went to Paris, where he designed furniture and decoration for the German-French art dealer Siegfried Bing, whose Paris gallery gave the style its name. He was also an early Art Nouveau theorist, demanding the use of dynamic, often opposing lines. Van de Velde wrote: "A line is a force like all the other elementary forces. Several lines put together but opposed have a presence as strong as several forces". In 1906, he departed Belgium for Weimar (Germany), where he founded the Grand-Ducal School of Arts and Crafts, where the teaching of historical styles was forbidden. He played an important role in the German Werkbund, before returning to Belgium.

The debut of Art Nouveau architecture in Brussels was accompanied by a wave of Decorative Art in the new style. Important artists included Gustave Strauven, who used wrought iron to achieve baroque effects on Brussels facades; the furniture designer Gustave Serrurier-Bovy, known for his highly original chairs and articulated metal furniture; and the jewellery designer Philippe Wolfers, who made jewellery in the form of dragonflies, butterflies, swans and serpents.

The Brussels International Exposition held in 1897 brought international attention to the style; Horta, Hankar, Van de Velde, and Serrurier-Bovy, among others, took part in the design of the fair, and Henri Privat-Livemont created the poster for the exhibition.

Paris – Maison de l'Art Nouveau (1895) and Castel Beranger (1895–1898) 

The Franco-German art dealer and publisher Siegfried Bing played a key role in publicizing the style. In 1891, he founded a magazine devoted to the art of Japan, which helped publicize Japonism in Europe. In 1892, he organized an exhibit of seven artists, among them Pierre Bonnard, Félix Vallotton, Édouard Vuillard, Toulouse-Lautrec and Eugène Grasset, which included both modern painting and decorative work. This exhibition was shown at the Société nationale des beaux-arts in 1895. In the same year, Bing opened a new gallery at 22 rue de Provence in Paris, the Maison de l'Art Nouveau, devoted to new works in both the fine and decorative arts. The interior and furniture of the gallery were designed by the Belgian architect Henry van de Velde, one of the pioneers of Art Nouveau architecture. The Maison de l'Art Nouveau showed paintings by Georges Seurat, Paul Signac and Toulouse-Lautrec, glass from Louis Comfort Tiffany and Émile Gallé, jewellery by René Lalique, and posters by Aubrey Beardsley. The works shown there were not at all uniform in style. Bing wrote in 1902, "Art Nouveau, at the time of its creation, did not aspire in any way to have the honor of becoming a generic term. It was simply the name of a house opened as a rallying point for all the young and ardent artists impatient to show the modernity of their tendencies."

The style was quickly noticed in neighbouring France. After visiting Horta's Hôtel Tassel, Hector Guimard built the Castel Béranger, among the first Paris buildings in the new style, between 1895 and 1898. Parisians had been complaining of the monotony of the architecture of the boulevards built under Napoleon III by Georges-Eugène Haussmann.  The Castel Beranger was a curious blend of Neo-Gothic and Art Nouveau, with curving whiplash lines and natural forms. Guimard, a skilled publicist for his work,  declared: "What must be avoided at all cost is...the parallel and symmetry. Nature is the greatest builder of all,  and nature makes nothing that is parallel and nothing that is symmetric."

Parisians welcomed Guimard's original and picturesque style; the Castel Béranger was chosen as one of the best new façades in Paris, launching Guimard's career.  Guimard was given the commission to design the entrances for the new Paris Métro system, which brought the style to the attention of the millions of visitors to the city's 1900 Exposition Universelle.

Paris Exposition Universelle (1900) 

The Paris 1900 Exposition universelle marked the high point of Art Nouveau. Between April and November 1900, it attracted nearly fifty million visitors from around the world, and showcased the architecture, design, glassware, furniture and decorative objects of the style. The architecture of the Exposition was often a mixture of Art Nouveau and Beaux-Arts architecture: the main exhibit hall, the Grand Palais had a Beaux-Arts façade completely unrelated to the spectacular Art Nouveau stairway and exhibit hall in the interior.

French designers all made special works for the Exhibition: Lalique crystal and jewellery; jewellery by Henri Vever and Georges Fouquet; Daum glass; the Manufacture nationale de Sèvres in porcelain; ceramics by Alexandre Bigot; sculpted glass lamps and vases by Émile Gallé; furniture by Édouard Colonna and Louis Majorelle; and many other prominent arts and crafts firms. At the 1900 Paris Exposition, Siegfried Bing presented a pavilion called  Art Nouveau Bing, which featured six different interiors entirely decorated in the Style.

The Exposition was the first international showcase for Art Nouveau designers and artists from across Europe and beyond. Prize winners and participants included Alphonse Mucha, who made murals for the pavilion of Bosnia-Herzegovina and designed the menu for the restaurant of the pavilion; the decorators and designers Bruno Paul and Bruno Möhring from Berlin; Carlo Bugatti from Turin; Bernhardt Pankok from Bavaria; The Russian architect-designer Fyodor Schechtel, and Louis Comfort Tiffany and Company from the United States. The Viennese architect Otto Wagner was a member of the jury, and presented a model of the Art Nouveau bathroom of his own town apartment in Vienna, featuring a glass bathtub. Josef Hoffmann designed the Viennese exhibit at the Paris exposition, highlighting the designs of the Vienna Secession. Eliel Saarinen first won international recognition for his imaginative design of the pavilion of Finland.

While the Paris Exposition was by far the largest, other expositions did much to popularize the style. The 1888 Barcelona Universal Exposition marked the beginning of the Modernisme style in Spain, with some buildings of Lluís Domènech i Montaner. The Esposizione internazionale d'arte decorativa moderna of 1902 in Turin, Italy, showcased designers from across Europe, including Victor Horta from Belgium and Joseph Maria Olbrich from Vienna, along with local artists such as Carlo Bugatti, Galileo Chini and Eugenio Quarti.

Local variations

Art Nouveau in France 

Following the 1900 Exposition, the capital of Art Nouveau was Paris. The most extravagant residences in the style were built by Jules Lavirotte, who entirely covered the façades with ceramic sculptural decoration. The most flamboyant example is the Lavirotte Building, at 29,  (1901). Office buildings and department stores featured high courtyards covered with stained glass cupolas and ceramic decoration. The style was particularly popular in restaurants and cafés, including Maxim's at 3, rue Royale, and Le Train bleu at the Gare de Lyon (1900).

The status of Paris attracted foreign artists to the city. The Swiss-born artist Eugène Grasset was one of the first creators of French Art Nouveau posters. He helped decorate the famous cabaret Le Chat Noir in 1885, made his first posters for the Fêtes de Paris and a celebrated poster of Sarah Bernhardt in 1890. In Paris, he taught at the Guérin school of art (École normale d'enseignement du dessin), where his students included Augusto Giacometti and Paul Berthon. Swiss-born Théophile-Alexandre Steinlen created the famous poster for the Paris cabaret Le Chat noir in 1896. The Czech artist Alphonse Mucha (1860–1939) arrived in Paris in 1888, and in 1895, made a poster for actress Sarah Bernhardt in the play Gismonda by Victorien Sardou in Théâtre de la Renaissance. The success of this poster led to a contract to produce posters for six more plays by Bernhardt.

The city of Nancy in Lorraine became the other French capital of the new style. In 1901, the Alliance provinciale des industries d'art, also known as the École de Nancy, was founded, dedicated to upsetting the hierarchy that put painting and sculpture above the decorative arts. The major artists working there included the glass vase and lamp creators Émile Gallé, the Daum brothers in glass design, and the designer Louis Majorelle, who created furniture with graceful floral and vegetal forms. The architect Henri Sauvage brought the new architectural style to Nancy with his Villa Majorelle in 1902.

The French style was widely propagated by new magazines, including The Studio, Arts et Idées and Art et Décoration, whose photographs and colour lithographs made the style known to designers and wealthy clients around the world.

In France, the style reached its summit in 1900, and thereafter slipped rapidly out of fashion, virtually disappearing from France by 1905. Art Nouveau was a luxury style, which required expert and highly-paid craftsmen, and could not be easily or cheaply mass-produced. One of the few Art Nouveau products that could be mass-produced was the perfume bottle, and these are still manufactured in the style today.

Art Nouveau in Belgium 

Belgium was an early centre of Art Nouveau, thanks largely to the architecture of Victor Horta, who designed one of the first Art Nouveau houses, the Hôtel Tassel in 1893, and three other townhouses in variations of the same style. They are now UNESCO World Heritage sites. Horta had a strong influence on the work of the young Hector Guimard, who came to see the Hôtel Tassel under construction, and later declared that Horta was the "inventor" of the Art Nouveau. Horta's innovation was not the facade, but the interior, using an abundance of iron and glass to open up space and flood the rooms with light, and decorating them with wrought iron columns and railings in curving vegetal forms, which were echoed on the floors and walls, as well as the furniture and carpets which Horta designed.

Paul Hankar was another pioneer of Brussels' Art Nouveau. His house was completed in 1893, the same year as Horta's Hôtel Tassel, and featured sgraffiti murals on the facade. Hankar was influenced by both Viollet-le-Duc and the ideas of the English Arts and Crafts movement. His conception idea was to bring together decorative and fine arts in a coherent whole. He commissioned the sculptor Alfred Crick and the painter  to decorate the facades of houses with their work. The most striking example was the house and studio built for the artist Albert Ciamberlani at 48, / in Brussels, for which he created an exuberant facade covered with sgraffito murals with painted figures and ornament, recreating the decorative architecture of the Quattrocento, or 15th-century Italy. Hankar died in 1901, when his work was just receiving recognition.

Gustave Strauven began his career as an assistant designer working with Horta, before he started his own practice at age 21, making some of the most extravagant Art Nouveau buildings in Brussels. His most famous work is the Saint-Cyr House at 11, /. It is entirely covered by polychrome bricks and a network of curling vegetal forms in wrought iron, in a virtually Art Nouveau-Baroque style.

Other important Art Nouveau artists from Belgium included the architect and designer Henry van de Velde, though the most important part of his career was spent in Germany; he strongly influenced the decoration of the Jugendstil. Others included the decorator Gustave Serrurier-Bovy, and the graphic artist Fernand Khnopff. Belgian designers took advantage of an abundant supply of ivory imported from the Belgian Congo; mixed sculptures, combining stone, metal and ivory, by such artists as Philippe Wolfers, was popular.

Nieuwe Kunst in the Netherlands 

It was influenced by the more geometric and stylized forms of the German Jugendstil and Austrian Vienna Secession. It was also influenced by the art and imported woods from Indonesia, then the Dutch East Indies, particularly the designs of the textiles and batik from Java.

The most important architect and furniture designer in the style was Hendrik Petrus Berlage, who denounced historical styles and advocated a purely functional architecture. He wrote, "It is necessary to fight against the art of illusion, to and to recognize the lie, in order to find the essence and not the illusion." Like Victor Horta and Gaudí, he was an admirer of architectural theories of Viollet-le-Duc. His furniture was designed to be strictly functional, and to respect the natural forms of wood, rather than bending or twisting it as if it were metal. He pointed to the example of Egyptian furniture, and preferred chairs with right angles. His first and most famous architectural work was the Beurs van Berlage (1896–1903), the Amsterdam Commodities Exchange, which he built following the principles of constructivism. Everything was functional, including the lines of rivets that decorated the walls of the main room. He often included very tall towers to his buildings to make them more prominent, a practice used by other Art Nouveau architects of the period, including Joseph Maria Olbrich in Vienna and Eliel Saarinen in Finland.

Other buildings in the style include the American Hotel (1898–1900), also by Berlage; and Astoria (1904–1905) by Herman Hendrik Baanders and Gerrit van Arkel in Amsterdam; the railway station in Haarlem (1906–1908), and the former office building of the Holland America Lines (1917) in Rotterdam, now the Hotel New York.

Prominent graphic artists and illustrators in the style included Jan Toorop, whose work inclined toward mysticism and symbolism, even in his posters for salad oil. In their colors and designs, they also sometimes showed the influence of the art of Java.

Important figures in Dutch ceramics and porcelain included Jurriaan Kok and Theo Colenbrander. They used colorful floral pattern and more traditional Art Nouveau motifs, combined with unusual forms of pottery and contrasting dark and light colors, borrowed from the batik decoration of Java.

Modern Style and Glasgow School in Britain 

Art Nouveau had its roots in Britain, in the Arts and Crafts movement which started in 1860s and reached international recognition by 1880s. It called for better treatment of decorative arts, and took inspiration in medieval craftmanship and design, and nature. One notable early example of the Modern Style is Arthur Mackmurdo's design for the cover of his essay on the city churches of Sir Christopher Wren, published in 1883, as is his Mahogany chair from the same year.

Other important innovators in Britain included the graphic designers Aubrey Beardsley whose drawings featured the curved lines that became the most recognizable feature of the style. Free-flowing wrought iron from the 1880s could also be adduced, or some flat floral textile designs, most of which owed some impetus to patterns of 19th century design. Other British graphic artists who had an important place in the style included Walter Crane and Charles Ashbee.

The Liberty department store in London played an important role, through its colourful stylized floral designs for textiles, and the silver, pewter, and jewellery designs of Manxman (of Scottish descent) Archibald Knox. His jewellery designs in materials and forms broke away entirely from the historical traditions of jewellery design.

For Art Nouveau architecture and furniture design, the most important centre in Britain was Glasgow, with the creations of Charles Rennie Mackintosh and the Glasgow School, whose work was inspired by Scottish baronial architecture and Japanese design. Beginning in 1895, Mackintosh displayed his designs at international expositions in London, Vienna, and Turin; his designs particularly influenced the Secession Style in Vienna. His architectural creations included the Glasgow Herald Building (1894) and the library of the Glasgow School of Art (1897). He also established a major reputation as a furniture designer and decorator, working closely with his wife, Margaret Macdonald Mackintosh, a prominent painter and designer. Together they created striking designs that combined geometric straight lines with gently curving floral decoration, particularly a famous symbol of the style, the 
Glasgow Rose".

Léon-Victor Solon, made an important contribution to Art Nouveau ceramics as art director at Mintons. He specialised in plaques and in tube-lined vases marketed as "secessionist ware" (usually described as named after the Viennese art movement). Apart from ceramics, he designed textiles for the Leek silk industry and doublures for a bookbinder (G.T.Bagguley of Newcastle-under-Lyme), who patented the Sutherland binding in 1895.

George Skipper was perhaps the most active Art Nouveau architect in England.  The Edward Everard building in Bristol, built during 1900–01 to house the printing works of Edward Everard, features an Art Nouveau façade. The figures depicted are of Johannes Gutenberg and William Morris, both eminent in the field of printing. A winged figure symbolises the "Spirit of Light", while a figure holding a lamp and mirror symbolises light and truth.

Jugendstil in Germany 

German Art Nouveau is commonly known by its German name, Jugendstil, or "Youth Style". The name is taken from the artistic journal, Die Jugend, or Youth, which was published in Munich. The magazine was founded in 1896 by Georg Hirth, who remained editor until his death in 1916. The magazine survived until 1940. During the early 20th century, Jugendstil was applied only to the graphic arts. It referred especially to the forms of typography and graphic design found in German magazines such as Jugend, Pan, and Simplicissimus. Jugendstil was later applied to other versions of Art Nouveau in Germany, the Netherlands. The term was borrowed from German by several languages of the Baltic states and Nordic countries to describe Art Nouveau (see Naming section).

In 1892 Georg Hirth chose the name Munich Secession for the Association of Visual Artists of Munich. The Vienna Secession, founded in 1897, and the Berlin Secession also took their names from the Munich group.

The journals Jugend and Simplicissimus, published in Munich, and Pan, published in Berlin, were important proponents of the Jugendstil. Jugendstil art combined sinuous curves and more geometric lines, and was used for covers of novels, advertisements, and exhibition posters. Designers often created original styles of typeface that worked harmoniously with the image, e.g. Arnold Böcklin typeface in 1904.

Otto Eckmann was one of the most prominent German artists associated with both Die Jugend and Pan.  His favourite animal was the swan, and so great was his influence that the swan came to serve as the symbol of the entire movement. Another prominent designer in the style was Richard Riemerschmid, who made furniture, pottery, and other decorative objects in a sober, geometric style that pointed forward toward Art Deco. The Swiss artist Hermann Obrist, living in Munich, illustrated the  coup de fouet or whiplash motif, a highly stylized double curve suggesting motion taken from the stem of the cyclamen flower.

The Darmstadt Artists' Colony was founded in 1899 by Ernest Ludwig, Grand Duke of Hesse. The architect who built Grand Duke's house, as well as the largest structure of the colony (Wedding tower), was Joseph Maria Olbrich, one of the Vienna Secession founders. Other notable artists of the colony were Peter Behrens and Hans Christiansen. Ernest Ludwig also commissioned to rebuild the spa complex in Bad Nauheim at the beginning of century.
Another member of the reigning family who commissioned an Art Nouveau structure was Princess Elisabeth of Hesse and by Rhine. She founded Marfo-Mariinsky Convent in Moscow in 1908 and its katholikon is recognized as an Art Nouveau masterpiece.

Another notable union in German Empire was the Deutscher Werkbund, founded in 1907 in Munich at the instigation of Hermann Muthesius by artists of Darmstadt Colony Joseph Maria Olbrich, Peter Behrens; by another founder of Vienna Secession Josef Hoffmann, as well as by Wiener Werkstätte (founded by Hoffmann), by Richard Riemerschmid, Bruno Paul and other artists and companies. Later Belgian Henry van de Velde joined the movement. The , founded by him in Weimar, was a predecessor of Bauhaus, one of the most influential currents in Modernist architecture.

In Berlin Jugendstil was chosen for the construction of several railway stations. The most notable is Bülowstraße by Bruno Möhring (1900–1902), other examples are Mexikoplatz (1902–1904), Botanischer Garten (1908–1909), Frohnau (1908–1910), Wittenbergplatz (1911–1913) and Pankow (1912–1914) stations. Another notable structure of Berlin is Hackesche Höfe (1906) which used polychrome glazed brick for the courtyard facade.

Art Nouveau in Strasbourg (then part of the German Empire as the capital of the Reichsland Elsaß-Lothringen) was a specific brand, in that it combined influences from Nancy, and Brussels, with influences from Darmstadt, and Vienna, to operate a local synthesis which reflected the history of the city between the Germanic and the French realms.

Secession in Austria–Hungary

Vienna Secession 

Vienna became the centre of a distinct variant of Art Nouveau, which became known as the Vienna Secession. The movement took its name from Munich Secession established in 1892. Vienna Secession was founded in April 1897 by a group of artists that included Gustav Klimt, Koloman Moser, Josef Hoffmann, Joseph Maria Olbrich, Max Kurzweil, Ernst Stöhr, and others. The painter Klimt became the president of the group. They objected to the conservative orientation toward historicism expressed by Vienna Künstlerhaus, the official union of artists. The Secession founded a magazine, Ver Sacrum, to promote their works in all media. The architect Joseph Olbrich designed the domed Secession building in the new style, which became a showcase for the paintings of Gustav Klimt and other Secession artists.

Klimt became the best-known of the Secession painters, often erasing the border between fine art painting and decorative painting. Koloman Moser was an extremely versatile artist in the style; his work including magazine illustrations, architecture, silverware, ceramics, porcelain, textiles, stained glass windows, and furniture.

The most prominent architect of the Vienna Secession was Otto Wagner, he joined the movement soon after its inception to follow his students Hoffmann and Olbrich. His major projects included several stations of the urban rail network (the Stadtbahn), the Linke Wienzeile Buildings (consisting of Majolica House, the House of Medallions and the house at Köstlergasse).  The Karlsplatz Station is now an exhibition hall of the Vienna Museum. The Kirche am Steinhof of Steinhof Psychiatric hospital (1904–1907) is a unique and finely-crafted example of Secession religious architecture, with a traditional domed exterior but sleek, modern gold and white interior lit by abundance of modern stained glass.

In 1899 Joseph Maria Olbrich moved to Darmstadt Artists' Colony, in 1903 Koloman Moser and Josef Hoffmann founded the Wiener Werkstätte, a training school and workshop for designers and craftsmen of furniture, carpets, textiles and decorative objects. In 1905 Koloman Moser and Gustav Klimt separated from Vienna Secession, later in 1907 Koloman Moser left Wiener Werkstätte as well, while its other founder Josef Hoffmann joined the Deutscher Werkbund. Gustav Klimt and Josef Hoffmann continued collaborating, they organized  in 1908 in Vienna and built the Stoclet Palace in Brussels (1905–1911) that announced the coming of modernist architecture. It was designated as a World Heritage Site by UNESCO in June 2009.

Hungarian Szecesszió 

The pioneer and prophet of the Szecesszió (Secession in Hungarian), the architect Ödön Lechner, created buildings which marked a transition from historicism to modernism for Hungarian architecture.
His idea for a Hungarian architectural style was the use of architectural ceramics and oriental motifs. In his works, he used pygorganite placed in production by 1886 by Zsolnay Porcelain Manufactory. This material was used in the construction of notable Hungarian buildings of other styles, e.g. the Hungarian Parliament Building and Matthias Church.

Works by Ödön Lechner include the Museum of Applied Arts (1893–1896), other building with similar distinctive features are Geological Museum (1896–1899) and The Postal Savings Bank building (1899–1902), all in Budapest. However, due to the opposition of Hungarian architectural establishment to Lechner's success, he soon was unable to get new commissions comparable to his earlier buildings. But Lechner was an inspiration and a master to the following generation of architects who played the main role in popularising the new style. Within the process of Magyarization numerous buildings were commissioned to his disciples in outskirts of the kingdom: e.g.  and Dezső Jakab were commissioned to build the Synagogue (1901–1903) and Town Hall (1908–1910) in Szabadka (now Subotica, Serbia), County Prefecture (1905–1907) and Palace of Culture (1911–1913) in Marosvásárhely (now Târgu Mureș, Romania). Later Lechner himself built the Blue Church in Pozsony (present-day Bratislava, Slovakia) in 1909–1913.

Another important architect was Károly Kós who was a follower of John Ruskin and William Morris. Kós took the Finnish National Romanticism movement as a model and the Transylvanian vernacular as the inspiration. His most notable buildings include the Roman Catholic Church in Zebegény (1908–09), pavilions for the Budapest Municipal Zoo (1909–1912) and the Székely National Museum in Sepsiszentgyörgy (now Sfântu Gheorghe, Romania, 1911–12).

The movement that promoted Szecesszió in arts was Gödöllő Art Colony, founded by Aladár Körösfői-Kriesch, also a follower John Ruskin and William Morris and a professor at the Royal School of Applied Arts in Budapest in 1901. Its artists took part in many projects, including the Franz Liszt Academy of Music in Budapest.

A notable furniture designer is  who combined traditional popular architecture, oriental architecture and international Art Nouveau in a highly picturesque style. , another Hungarian designer, had a much more sober and functional style, made of oak with delicate traceries of ebony and brass.

Secession in Prague and elsewhere 

The most notable Secession buildings in Prague are examples of total art with distinctive architecture, sculpture and paintings. The main railway station (1901–1909) was designed by Josef Fanta and features paintings of Václav Jansa and sculptures of Ladislav Šaloun and Stanislav Sucharda along with other artists. The Municipal House (1904–1912) was designed by Osvald Polívka and Antonín Balšánek, painted by famous Czech painter Alphonse Mucha and features sculptures of Josef Mařatka and Ladislav Šaloun. Polívka, Mařatka, and Šaloun simultaneously cooperated in the construction of New City Hall (1908–1911) along with Stanislav Sucharda, and Mucha later painted St. Vitus Cathedral's stained glass windows in his distinctive style.

The style of combining Hungarian Szecesszió and national architectural elements was typical for a Slovak architect Dušan Jurkovič. His most original works are the Cultural House in Szakolca (now Skalica in Slovakia, 1905), the buildings of spa in Luhačovice (now Czech Republic) in 1901–1903 and 35 war cemeteries near Nowy Żmigród in Galicia (now Poland), most of them heavily influenced by local Lemko (Rusyn) folk art and carpentry (1915–1917).

The most prolific Slovenian Secession architect was Ciril Metod Koch. He studied at Otto Wagner's classes in Vienna and worked in the Laybach (now Ljubljana, Slovenia) City Council from 1894 to 1923. After the earthquake in Laybach in 1895, he designed many secular buildings in Secession style that he adopted from 1900 to 1910: Pogačnik House (1901), Čuden Building (1901), The Farmers Loan Bank (1906–07), renovated Hauptmann Building in Secession style in 1904.  The highlight of his career was the Loan Bank in Radmannsdorf (now Radovljica) in 1906.

Art Nouveau in Romania 

Art Nouveau appears in Romania during the same years as it does in Western Europe (early 1890s until the outbreak of World War I in 1914), but here few are the buildings in this style, the Beaux Arts being predominant. The most famous of them is the Constanța Casino. Most of the Romanian examples of Art Nouveau architecture are actually mixes of Beaux Arts and Art Nouveau, like the Romulus Porescu House or house no. 61 on Strada Vasile Lascăr, both in Bucharest. This is because the style was somewhat illegal in Romanian architecture, due to being popular in Transilvania, part of the Austro-Hungarian Empire at that time, where Romanians were suppressed and discriminated, despite being the majority of the population. So, the people who wanted an Art Nouveau home in the 1900s and early 1910s could only put some subtile ornaments reminiscent of the style, while the rest was completely Beaux Arts or in some rare cases Romanian Revival. An example of this is the Fanny and Isac Popper House in Bucharest (Strada Sfinților no. 1), 1914, by Alfred Popper, which is primarily in the Beaux Arts academic style, but has some Art Nouveau reliefs of women dancing and playing musical instruments at the bases of the two pilasters and flowers above the arch door. A frequent feature reminiscent of the style are the arch windows which have curvy woodwork elements. However, this window feature may not necessarily be Art Nouveau, since Beaux Arts and Rococo Revival architecture tends to use curvy and sinuous lines, especially during the 1890s, 1900s and 1910s.

One of the most notable Art Nouveau painters from Romania was Ștefan Luchian, who quickly took over the innovative and decorative directions of Art Nouveau for a short period of time. The moment was synchronized with the founding of the Ileana Society in 1897, of which he was a founding member, a company that organized an exhibition (1898) at the Union Hotel entitled The Exhibition of Independent Artists and published a magazine – the Ileana Magazine.

Transylvania has examples of both Art Nouveau and Romanian Revival buildings, the former being from the Austro-Hungarian era. Most of them can be found in Oradea, nicknamed the "Art Nouveau capital of Romania", but also in Timișoara, Târgu Mureș and Sibiu.

Stile Liberty in Italy 

Art Nouveau in Italy was known as arte nuova, stile floreale, stile moderno and especially stile Liberty. Liberty style took its name from Arthur Lasenby Liberty and the store he founded in 1874 in London, Liberty Department Store, which specialised in importing ornaments, textiles and art objects from Japan and the Far East, and whose colourful textiles which were particularly popular in Italy. Notable Italian designers in the style included Galileo Chini, whose ceramics were often inspired both by majolica patterns. He was later known as a painter and a theatrical scenery designer; he designed the sets for two celebrated Puccini operas Gianni Schicchi and Turandot.

Liberty style architecture varied greatly, and often followed historical styles, particularly the Baroque.  Facades were often drenched with decoration and sculpture.  Examples of the Liberty style include the Villino Florio (1899–1902) by Ernesto Basile in Palermo; the Palazzo Castiglioni in Milan by Giuseppe Sommaruga (1901–1903); Milan, and the Casa Guazzoni (1904–05) in Milan by Giovanni Battista Bossi (1904–06).

Colorful frescoes, painted or in ceramics, and sculpture, both in the interior and exterior, were a popular feature of Liberty style.  They drew upon both classical and floral themes. as in the baths of Acque della Salute, and in the Casa Guazzoni in Milan.

The most important figure in Liberty style design was Carlo Bugatti, the son of an architect and decorator, father of Rembrandt Bugatti, Liberty sculptor, and of Ettore Bugatti, famous automobile designer. He studied at the Milanese Academy of Brera, and later the Académie des Beaux-Arts in Paris. His work was distinguished by its exoticism and eccentricity, included silverware, textiles, ceramics, and musical instruments, but he is best remembered for his innovative furniture designs, shown first in the 1888 Milan Fine Arts Fair. His furniture often featured a keyhole design, and had unusual coverings, including parchment and silk, and inlays of bone and ivory. It also sometimes had surprising organic shapes, copied after snails and cobras.

Art Nouveau and Secession in Serbia

Due to the close proximity to Austria–Hungary and Vojvodina being part of the empire until 1918, both the Vienna Secession and Hungarian Szecesszió were prevalent movements in what is today's northern Serbia, as well as the Capital of Belgrade. Famous Austrian and Hungarian architects would design many buildings in Subotica, Novi Sad, Palić, Zrenjanin, Vrbas, Senta, and Kikinda. Art Nouveau heritage in Belgrade, Pančevo, Aranđelovac, and Vrnjačka Banja are a mixture of French, German, Austrian, Hungarian, and local Serbian movements. From the curvy floral beauty of the Subotica's Synagogue to the Morava-style inspired rosettes on Belgrade's telegraph building, Art Nouveau architecture takes various shapes in present-day Serbia.

Back in early 1900s, north of the Sava and the Danube, resurgent Hungarian national sentiment infused the buildings in Subotica and Senta with local floral ethnic motifs, while in the tiny Kingdom of Serbia, national romantics like Branko Tanezević and Dragutin Inkiostiri-Medenjak (both born in the Austro-Hungarian Empire), translated Serbia's traditional motifs into marvellous buildings. Other architects, like Milan Antonović and Nikola Nestorović brought the then-fashionable sinuous lines and natural motifs to the homes and businesses of their wealthy patrons, so they could show off their worldliness and keeping up with the trends in Paris, Munich and Vienna.

Modernismo and Modernisme in Spain 

A highly original variant of the style emerged in Barcelona, Catalonia, at about the same time that the Art Nouveau style appeared in Belgium and France. It was called Modernisme in Catalan and Modernismo in Spanish. Its most famous creator was Antoni Gaudí. Gaudí used floral and organic forms in a very novel way in Palau Güell (1886–1890). According to UNESCO, "the architecture of the park combined elements from the Arts and Crafts movement, Symbolism, Expressionism, and Rationalism, and presaged and influenced many forms and techniques of 20th-century Modernism."
He integrated crafts as ceramics, stained glass, wrought ironwork forging and carpentry into his architecture. In his Güell Pavilions (1884–1887) and then Parc Güell (1900–1914) he also used a new technique called trencadís, which used waste ceramic pieces. His designs from about 1903, the Casa Batlló (1904–1906) and Casa Milà (1906–1912), are most closely related to the stylistic elements of Art Nouveau. Later structures such as  Sagrada Família combined Art Nouveau elements with revivalist Neo-Gothic. Casa Batlló, Casa Milà, Güell Pavilions, and Parc Güell were results of his collaboration with Josep Maria Jujol, who himself created houses in Sant Joan Despí (1913–1926), several churches near Tarragona (1918 and 1926) and the sinuous Casa Planells (1924) in Barcelona.

Besides the dominating presence of Gaudí, Lluís Domènech i Montaner also used Art Nouveau in Barcelona in buildings such as the Castell dels Tres Dragons (1888), Casa Lleó Morera, Palau de la Música Catalana (1905) and Hospital de Sant Pau (1901–1930). The two latter buildings have been listed by UNESCO as World Cultural Heritage.

Another major modernista was Josep Puig i Cadafalch, who designed the Casa Martí and its Els Quatre Gats café, the Casimir Casaramona textile factory (now the CaixaFòrum art museum), Casa Macaya, Casa Amatller, the Palau del Baró de Quadras (housing Casa Àsia for 10 years until 2013) and the Casa de les Punxes ("House of Spikes").

A distinctive Art Nouveau movement was also in the Valencian Community. Some of the notable architects were Demetrio Ribes Marco, Vicente Pascual Pastor, Timoteo Briet Montaud, and José María Manuel Cortina Pérez. Valencian Art Nouveau defining characteristics are a notable use of ceramics in decoration, both in the facade and in ornamentation, and also the use of Valencian regional motives.

Another remarkable variant is the Madrilenian Art Nouveau or "Modernismo madrileño", with such notable buildings as the Longoria Palace, the Casino de Madrid or the Cementerio de la Almudena, among others.

The Modernisme movement left a wide art heritage including drawings, paintings, sculptures, glass and metal work, mosaics, ceramics, and furniture. A part of it can be found in Museu Nacional d'Art de Catalunya.

Inspired by a Paris café called Le Chat Noir, where he had previously worked,  decided to open a café in Barcelona that was named Els Quatre Gats (Four Cats in Catalan). The café became a central meeting point for Barcelona's most prominent figures of Modernisme, such as Pablo Picasso and Ramon Casas i Carbó who helped to promote the movement by his posters and postcards. For the café he created a picture called Ramon Casas and Pere Romeu on a Tandem that was replaced with his another composition entitled Ramon Casas and Pere Romeu in an Automobile in 1901, symbolizing the new century.

Antoni Gaudí designed furniture for many of the houses he built; one example is an armchair called the for the Battle House. He influenced another notable Catalan furniture designer,  (1870–1953) who often combined marquetry and mosaics with his furnishings.

Arte Nova in Portugal 

The Art Nouveau variant in Aveiro (Portugal) was called Arte Nova, and its principal characteristic feature was ostentation: the style was used by bourgeoisie who wanted to express their wealth on the facades while leaving the interiors conservative. Another distinctive feature of Arte Nova was the use of locally produced tiles with Art Nouveau motifs.

The most influential artist of Arte Nova was Francisco Augusto da Silva Rocha. Though he was not trained as an architect, he designed many buildings in Aveiro and in other cities in Portugal. One of them, the Major Pessoa residence,  has both an Art Nouveau facade and interior, and now hosts the Museum of Arte Nova.

There are other examples of Arte Nova in other cities of Portugal.

Jugendstil in the Nordic countries

Finland 

Art Nouveau was popular in the Nordic countries, where it was usually known as Jugendstil, and was often combined with the National Romantic Style of each country. The Nordic country with the largest number of Jugendstil buildings is the Grand Duchy of Finland, then a part of Russian Empire. The Jugendstil period coincided with Golden Age of Finnish Art and national awakening. After Paris Exposition in 1900 the leading Finnish artist was Akseli Gallen-Kallela. He is known for his illustrations of the Kalevala, the Finnish national epic, as well as for painting numerous Judendstil buildings in the Duchy.

The architects of the Finnish pavilion at the Exposition were Herman Gesellius, Armas Lindgren, and Eliel Saarinen. They worked together from 1896 to 1905 and created many notable buildings in Helsinki including Pohjola Insurance building (1899–1901) and National Museum of Finland (1905–1910) as well as their joint residence Hvitträsk in Kirkkonummi (1902). Architects were inspired by Nordic legends and nature, rough granite façade thus became a symbol for belonging to the Finnish nation. After the firm dissolved, Saarinen designed the Helsinki Railway Station (1905–1914) in clearer forms, influenced by American architecture. The sculptor who worked with Saarinen in construction of National Museum of Finland and Helsinki Railway Station was Emil Wikström.

Another architect who created several notable works in Finland was Lars Sonck. His major Jugendstil works include Tampere Cathedral (1902–1907), Ainola, the home of Jean Sibelius (1903), Headquarters of the Helsinki Telephone Association (1903–1907) and Kallio Church in Helsinki (1908–1912). Also, Magnus Schjerfbeck, brother of Helene Schjerfbeck, made tuberculosis sanatorium known as Nummela Sanatorium in 1903 using the Jugendstil style.

Norway 

Norway also was aspiring independence (from Sweden) and local Art Nouveau was connected with a revival inspired by Viking folk art and crafts. Notable designers included Lars Kisarvik, who designed chairs with traditional Viking and Celtic patterns, and Gerhard Munthe, who designed a chair with a stylized dragon-head emblem from ancient Viking ships, as well as a wide variety of posters, paintings and graphics.

The Norwegian town of Ålesund is regarded as the main centre of Art Nouveau in Scandinavia because it was completely reconstructed after a fire of 23 January 1904. About 350 buildings were built between 1904 and 1907 under an urban plan designed by the engineer Frederik Næsser. The merger of unity and variety gave birth to a style known as Ål Stil. Buildings of the style have linear decor and echoes of both Jugendstil and vernacular elements, e.g. towers of stave churches or the crested roofs. One of the buildings, Swan Pharmacy, now hosts the Art Nouveau Centre.

Sweden and Denmark 

Jugendstil masterpieces of other Nordic countries include Engelbrektskyrkan (1914) and Royal Dramatic Theater (1901–1908) in Stockholm, Sweden and former City Library (now Danish National Business Archives) in Aarhus, Denmark (1898–1901). The architect of the latter is Hack Kampmann, then a proponent of National Romantic Style who also created Custom House, Theatre and Villa Kampen in Aarhus. Denmark's most notable Art Nouveau designer was the silversmith Georg Jensen. The Baltic Exhibition in Malmö 1914 can be seen as the last major manifestation of the Jugendstil in Sweden.

Modern in Russia 

Модерн ("Modern") was a very colourful Russian variation of Art Nouveau which appeared in Moscow and Saint Petersburg in 1898 with the publication of a new art journal, "Мир искусства" (transliteration: Mir Iskusstva) ("The World of Art"), by Russian artists Alexandre Benois and Léon Bakst, and chief editor Sergei Diaghilev. The magazine organized exhibitions of leading Russian artists, including Mikhail Vrubel, Konstantin Somov, Isaac Levitan, and the book illustrator Ivan Bilibin. The World of Art style made less use of the vegetal and floral forms of French Art Nouveau; it drew heavily upon the bright colours and exotic designs of Russian folklore and fairy tales. The most influential contribution of the "World of Art" was the creation of a new ballet company, the Ballets Russes, headed by Diaghilev, with costumes and sets designed by Bakst and Benois. The new ballet company premiered in Paris in 1909, and performed there every year through 1913. The exotic and colourful sets designed by Benois and Bakst had a major impact on French art and design. The costume and set designs were reproduced in the leading Paris magazines, L'Illustration, La Vie parisienne and Gazette du bon ton, and the Russian style became known in Paris as à la Bakst. The company was stranded in Paris first by the outbreak of World War I, and then by the Russian Revolution in 1917, and ironically never performed in Russia.

Of Russian architects, the most prominent in the pure Art Nouveau style was Fyodor Schechtel. The most famous example is the Ryabushinsky House in Moscow. It was built by a Russian businessman and newspaper owner, and then, after the Russian Revolution, became the residence of the writer Maxim Gorky, and is now the Gorky Museum. Its main staircase, made of a polished aggregate of concrete, marble and granite, has flowing, curling lines like the waves of the sea, and is illuminated by a lamp in the form of a floating jellyfish. The interior also features doors, windows and ceiling decorated with colorful frescoes of mosaic. Schechtel, who is also considered a major figure in Russian symbolism, designed several other landmark buildings in Moscow, including the rebuilding of the Moscow Yaroslavsky railway station, in a more traditional Moscow revival style.

Other Russian architects of the period created Russian Revival architecture, which drew from historic Russian architecture. These buildings were created mostly in wood, and referred to the Architecture of Kievan Rus'.  One example is the Teremok House in Talashkino (1901–1902) by Sergey Malyutin, and Pertsova House (also known as Pertsov House) in Moscow (1905–1907). He also was a member of Mir iskusstva movement.  The Saint Petersburg architect Nikolai Vasilyev built in a range of styles before emigrating in 1923. This building is most notable for stone carvings made by Sergei Vashkov inspired by the carvings of Cathedral of Saint Demetrius in Vladimir and Saint George Cathedral in Yuryev-Polsky of the XII and XIII centuries. Another example of this Russian Revival architecture is the Marfo-Mariinsky Convent (1908–1912), an updated Russian Orthodox Church by Alexey Shchusev, who later, ironically, designed Lenin's Mausoleum in Moscow.

Several art colonies in Russia in this period were built in the Russian Revival style.  The two best-known colonies were Abramtsevo, funded by Savva Mamontov, and Talashkino, Smolensk Governorate, funded by Princess Maria Tenisheva.

Jūgendstils (Art Nouveau in Riga) 

Riga, the present-day capital of Latvia, was at the time one of the major cities of the Russian Empire. Art Nouveau architecture in Riga nevertheless developed according to its own dynamics, and the style became overwhelmingly popular in the city.  Soon after the Latvian Ethnographic Exhibition in 1896 and the Industrial and Handicrafts Exhibition in 1901, Art Nouveau became the dominant style in the city. Thus Art Nouveau architecture accounts for one-third of all the buildings in the centre of Riga, making it the city with the highest concentration of such buildings anywhere in the world. The quantity and quality of Art Nouveau architecture was among the criteria for including Riga in UNESCO World Cultural Heritage.

There were different variations of Art Nouveau architecture in Riga:
 in Eclectic Art Nouveau, floral and other nature-inspired elements of decoration were most popular. Examples of that variation are works of Mikhail Eisenstein,
 in Perpendicular Art Nouveau, geometrical ornaments were integrated into the vertical compositions of the facades. Several department stores were built in this style, and it is sometimes also referred to as "department store style" or Warenhausstil in German,
 National Romantic Art Nouveau was inspired by local folk art, monumental volumes and the use of natural building materials.
Some later Neo-Classical buildings also contained Art Nouveau details.

Style Sapin in La Chaux-de-Fonds, Switzerland 

A variation called Style Sapin ("Pine Tree Style") emerged in La Chaux-de-Fonds in the Canton of Neuchâtel in Switzerland.  The style was launched by the painter and artist Charles l’Eplattenier and was inspired especially by the sapin, or pine tree, and other plants and wildlife of the Jura Mountains. One of his major works was the Crematorium in the town, which featured triangular tree forms, pine cones, and other natural themes from the region. The style also blended in the more geometric stylistic elements of Jugendstil and Vienna Secession.

Another notable building in the style is the Villa Fallet La Chaux-de-Fonds, a chalet designed and built in 1905 by a student of L'Epplattenier, the eighteen-year-old Le Corbusier. The form of the house was a traditional Swiss chalet, but the decoration of the facade included triangular trees and other natural features. Le Corbusier built two more chalets in the area, including the Villa Stotzer, in a more traditional chalet style.

Tiffany Style and Louis Sullivan in the United States 

In the United States, the firm of Louis Comfort Tiffany played a central role in American Art Nouveau. Born in 1848, he studied at the National Academy of Design in New York, began working with glass at the age of 24, entered the family business started by his father, and in 1885 set up his own enterprise devoted to fine glass, and developed new techniques for its colouring. In 1893, he began making glass vases and bowls, again developing new techniques that allowed more original shapes and colouring, and began experimenting with decorative window glass. Layers of glass were printed, marbled and superimposed, giving an exceptional richness and variety of colour in 1895 his new works were featured in the Art Nouveau gallery of Siegfried Bing, giving him a new European clientele. After the death of his father in 1902, he took over the entire Tiffany enterprise, but still devoted much of his time to designing and manufacturing glass art objects. At the urging of Thomas Edison, he began to manufacture electric lamps with multicoloured glass shades in structures of bronze and iron, or decorated with mosaics, produced in numerous series and editions, each made with the care of a piece of jewellery. A team of designers and craftsmen worked on each product. The Tiffany lamp in particular became one of the icons of the Art Nouveau, but Tiffany's craftsmen designed and made extraordinary windows, vases, and other glass art. Tiffany's glass also had great success at the 1900 Exposition Universelle in Paris; his stained glass window called the Flight of Souls won a gold medal. The Columbian Exposition was an important venue for Tiffany; a chapel he designed was shown at the Pavilion of Art and Industry. The Tiffany Chapel, along with one of the windows of Tiffany's home in New York, are now on display at the Charles Hosmer Morse Museum of American Art in Winter Park, Florida.

Another important figure in American Art Nouveau was the architect Louis Sullivan. Sullivan was a leading pioneer of American modern architecture. He was the founder of the Chicago School, the architect of some of the first skyscrapers, and the teacher of Frank Lloyd Wright.  His most famous saying was "Form follows function". While the form of his buildings was shaped by their function, his decoration was an example of American Art Nouveau.  At the 1893 World's Columbian Exposition in Chicago, most famous for the neoclassical architecture of its renowned White City, he designed a spectacular Art Nouveau entrance for the very functional Transportation Building.

While the architecture of his Carson, Pirie, Scott and Company Building (1899)  (now the Sullivan Center) was strikingly modern and functional, he surrounded the windows with stylized floral decoration.  He invented equally original decoration for the National Farmer's Bank of Owatonna, Minnestota (1907–1908) and the Merchants' National Bank in Grinell, Iowa. He invented a specifically American variety of Art Nouveau, declaring that decorative forms should oscillate, surge, mix and derive without end.  He created works of great precision which sometimes combined Gothic with Art Nouveau themes.

Art Nouveau in Argentina 

Flooded with European immigrants, Argentina welcomed all artistic and architectural European styles, including Art Nouveau. Cities with the most notable Art Nouveau heritage in Argentina are Buenos Aires, Rosario and Mar del Plata.

Paris was a prototype for Buenos Aires with the construction of large boulevards and avenues in the 19th century. The local style along with French influence was also following Italian Liberty as many architects (Virginio Colombo, Francisco Gianotti, Mario Palanti) were Italians. In works of  Catalan influence can be noted as he completed his studies in Barcelona in 1900. The influence of Vienna Secession can be found at Paso y Viamonte building.

The introduction of Art Nouveau in Rosario is connected to  who trained in Barcelona. His  (1912) features one of the largest stained glass windows in Latin America produced (as well as tiling and ceramics) by the local firm Buxadera, Fornells y Cía. The sculptor of the building is Diego Masana from Barcelona.

Belgian influence on Argentinian Art Nouveau is represented by the Villa Ortiz Basualdo, now hosting the Juan Carlos Castagnino Municipal Museum of Art in Mar del Plata where the furniture, interiors, and lighting are by Gustave Serrurier-Bovy.

Art Nouveau in the rest of the world 

As in Argentina, Art Nouveau in other countries was mostly influenced by foreign artists:
 Spaniards were behind Art Nouveau projects in Havana, Cuba, they were even not qualified enough to be called architects. Spaniards were not directly involved in works in Ponce, Puerto Rico but were an inspiration and a subject of study for local architects in Ponce, Puerto Rico,
 French were behind Art Nouveau in Tunisia (that was a French protectorate then),
 Germans were behind Jugendstil heritage of Lüderitz, Namibia; Qingdao, China,
 Italians were behind Art Nouveau in Valparaiso, Chile; Montevideo, Uruguay; Rio de Janeiro, Brasil,
 Russians were behind Art Nouveau heritage of Harbin, China,
 Art Nouveau Heritage in Lima consists of work of Italians Masperi brothers, French architect Claude Sahut and British masters of stained glass
 Palacio de Bellas Artes in Mexico City was a result of the cooperation of Italians (architect Adamo Boari and sculptor Leonardo Bistolfi), local architect , Hungarian artists Aladár Körösfői-Kriesch, Géza Maróti and Miksa Róth, Catalan sculptor Agustí Querol Subirats and French master Edgar Brandt.

Art Nouveau motifs can also be found in French Colonial artchitechture throughout French Indochina.

A notable art movement called Bezalel school appeared in the Palestine region in dating to the late Ottoman and British Mandate periods. It has been described as "a fusion of oriental art and Jugendstil." Several artists associated with the Bezalel school were noted for their Art Nouveau style, including Ze'ev Raban, Ephraim Moses Lilien and Abel Pann.

Characteristics 

Early Art Nouveau, particularly in Belgium and France, was characterized by undulating, curving forms inspired by lilies, vines, flower stems and other natural forms, used in particular in the interiors of Victor Horta and the decoration of Louis Majorelle and Émile Gallé. It also drew upon patterns based on butterflies and dragonflies, borrowed from Japanese art, which were popular in Europe at the time.

Early Art Nouveau also often featured more stylized forms expressing movement, such as the coup de fouet or "whiplash" line, depicted in the cyclamen plants drawn by designer Hermann Obrist in 1894. A description published in Pan magazine of Hermann Obrist's wall hanging Cyclamen (1894), compared it to the  "sudden violent curves generated by the crack of a whip," The term "whiplash", though it was originally used to ridicule the style, is frequently applied to the characteristic curves employed by Art Nouveau artists. Such decorative undulating and flowing lines in a syncopated rhythm and asymmetrical shape, are often found in the architecture, painting, sculpture, and other forms of Art Nouveau design.

Other floral forms were popular, inspired by lilies, wisteria and other flowers, particularly in the lamps of Louis Comfort Tiffany and the glass objects made by the artists of the School of Nancy and Émile Gallé. Other curving and undulating forms borrowed from nature included butterflies, peacocks, swans, and water lilies.  Many designs depicted women's hair intertwined with stems of lilies, irises and other flowers. Stylized floral forms were particularly used by Victor Horta in carpets, balustrades, windows, and furniture.  They were also used extensively by Hector Guimard for balustrades, and, most famously, for the lamps and railings at the entrances of the Paris Metro. Guimard explained: "That which must be avoided in everything that is continuous is the parallel and symmetry. Nature is the greatest builder and nature makes nothing that is parallel and nothing that is symmetrical."

Earlier Art Nouveau furniture, such as that made by Louis Majorelle and Henry van de Velde, was characterized by the use of exotic and expensive materials, including mahogany with inlays of precious woods and trim, and curving forms without right angles. It gave a sensation of lightness.

In the second phase of Art Nouveau, following 1900, the decoration became purer and the lines were more stylized. The curving lines and forms evolved into polygons and then into cubes and other geometric forms. These geometric forms were used with particular effect in the architecture and furniture of Joseph Maria Olbrich, Otto Wagner, Koloman Moser and Josef Hoffmann, especially the Stoclet Palace in Brussels, which announced the arrival of Art Deco and modernism.

Another characteristic of Art Nouveau architecture was the use of light, by opening up of interior spaces, by the removal of walls, and the extensive use of skylights to bring a maximum amount of light into the interior. Victor Horta's residence-studio and other houses built by him had extensive skylights, supported on curving iron frames. In the Hotel Tassel he removed the traditional walls around the stairway, so that the stairs became a central element of the interior design.

Relationship with contemporary styles and movements 

As an art style, Art Nouveau has affinities with the Pre-Raphaelites and the Symbolist styles, and artists like Aubrey Beardsley, Alphonse Mucha, Edward Burne-Jones, Gustav Klimt and Jan Toorop could be classed in more than one of these styles. Unlike Symbolist painting, however, Art Nouveau has a distinctive appearance; and, unlike the artisan-oriented Arts and Crafts movement, Art Nouveau artists readily used new materials, machined surfaces, and abstraction in the service of pure design.

Art Nouveau did not eschew the use of machines, as the Arts and Crafts movement did. For sculpture, the principal materials employed were glass and wrought iron, resulting in sculptural qualities even in architecture. Ceramics were also employed in creating editions of sculptures by artists such as Auguste Rodin. though his sculpture is not considered Art Nouveau.

Art Nouveau architecture made use of many technological innovations of the late 19th century, especially the use of exposed iron and large, irregularly shaped pieces of glass for architecture.

Art Nouveau tendencies were also absorbed into local styles. In Denmark, for example, it was one aspect of Skønvirke ("aesthetic work"), which itself more closely relates to the Arts and Crafts style. Likewise, artists adopted many of the floral and organic motifs of Art Nouveau into the Młoda Polska ("Young Poland") style in Poland. Młoda Polska, however, was also inclusive of other artistic styles and encompassed a broader approach to art, literature, and lifestyle.

Architecturally, Art Nouveau has affinities with styles that, although modern, exist outside the modernist tradition established by architects like Walter Gropius and Le Corbusier. It is particularly closely related to Expressionist architecture, which shares its preference for organic shapes, but grew out of an intellectual dissatisfaction with Art Nouveau's approach to ornamentation. As opposed to Art Nouveau's focus on plants and vegetal motifs, Expressionism takes inspiration from things like caves, mountains, lightning, crystal, and rock formations. Another style conceived as a reaction to Art Nouveau was Art Deco, which rejected organic surfaces altogether in preference for a rectilinear style derived from the contemporary artistic avant-garde.

Genres 
Art Nouveau is represented in painting and sculpture, but it is most prominent in architecture and the decorative arts.  It was well-suited to the graphic arts, especially the poster, interior design, metal and glass art, jewellery, furniture design, ceramics and textiles.

Posters and graphic art

The graphic arts flourished in the Art Nouveau period, thanks to new technologies of printing, particularly colour lithography, which allowed the mass production of colour posters. Art was no longer confined to galleries, museums and salons; it could be found on Paris walls, and in illustrated art magazines, which circulated throughout Europe and to the United States. The most popular theme of Art Nouveau posters was women; women symbolizing glamour, modernity and beauty, often surrounded by flowers.

In Britain, the leading graphic artist in the Art Nouveau style was Aubrey Beardsley (1872–1898). He began with engraved book illustrations for Le Morte d'Arthur, then black and white illustrations for Salome by Oscar Wilde (1893), which brought him fame. In the same year, he began engraving illustrations and posters for the art magazine The Studio, which helped publicize European artists such as Fernand Khnopff in Britain. The curving lines and intricate floral patterns attracted as much attention as the text.

The Swiss-French artist Eugène Grasset (1845–1917) was one of the first creators of French Art Nouveau posters. He helped decorate the famous cabaret Le Chat noir in 1885 and made his first posters for the Fêtes de Paris. He made a celebrated poster of Sarah Bernhardt in 1890, and a wide variety of book illustrations. The artist-designers Jules Chéret, Georges de Feure and the painter Henri de Toulouse-Lautrec all made posters for Paris theaters, cafés, dance halls cabarets. The Czech artist Alphonse Mucha (1860–1939) arrived in Paris in 1888, and in 1895 made a poster for actress Sarah Bernhardt in the play Gismonda by Victorien Sardou. The success of this poster led to a contract to produce posters for six more plays by Bernhardt. Over the next four years, he also designed sets, costumes, and even jewellery for the actress. Based on the success of his theater posters, Mucha made posters for a variety of products, ranging from cigarettes and soap to beer biscuits, all featuring an idealized female figure with an hourglass figure. He went on to design products, from jewellery to biscuit boxes, in his distinctive style.

In Vienna, the most prolific designer of graphics and posters was Koloman Moser (1868–1918), who actively participated in the Secession movement with Gustav Klimt and Josef Hoffmann, and made illustrations and covers for the magazine of the movement, Ver Sacrum, as well as paintings, furniture and decoration.

Painting

Painting was another domain of Art Nouveau, though most painters associated with Art Nouveau are primarily described as members of other movements, particularly post-impressionism and symbolism. Alphonse Mucha was famous for his Art Nouveau posters, which frustrated him. According to his son and biographer, Jiří Mucha, he did not think much of Art Nouveau.  "What is it, Art Nouveau? he asked. "...Art can never be new." He took the greatest pride in his work as a history painter. His one Art-Nouveau inspired painting, "Slava", is a portrait of the daughter of his patron in Slavic costume, which was modelled after his theatrical posters.

The painters most closely associated with Art Nouveau were Les Nabis, post-impressionist artists who were active in Paris from 1888 until 1900. One of their stated goals was to break down the barrier between the fine arts and the decorative arts. They painted not only canvases, but also decorative screens and panels. Many of their works were influenced by the aesthetics of Japanese prints. The members included Pierre Bonnard, Maurice Denis, Paul Ranson, Édouard Vuillard, Ker-Xavier Roussel, Félix Vallotton, and Paul Sérusier.

In Belgium, Fernand Khnopff worked in both painting and graphic design. Wall murals by Gustav Klimt were integrated into decorative scheme of Josef Hoffmann for the Stoclet Palace (1905–1911). The Klimt mural for the dining room at the Stoclet Palace is considered a masterpiece of late Art Nouveau.

One subject did appear both in traditional painting and Art Nouveau; the American dancer Loie Fuller, was portrayed by French and Austrian painters and poster artists.

One particular style that became popular in the Art Nouveau period, especially in Brussels, was sgraffito, a technique invented in the Renaissance of applying layers of tinted plaster to make murals on the facades of houses. This was used in particular by Belgian architect Paul Hankar for the houses he built for two artist friends, Paul Cauchie and Albert Ciamberlani.

Glass art

Glass art was a medium in which Art Nouveau found new and varied ways of expression. Intense amount of experimentation went on, particularly in France, to find new effects of transparency and opacity: in engraving win cameo, double layers, and acid engraving, a technique that permitted production in series. The city of Nancy became an important centre for the French glass industry, and the workshops of Émile Gallé and the Daum studio, led by Auguste and Antonin Daum, were located there. They developed a new method of incrusting glass by pressing fragments of different coloured glass into the unfinished piece. They often collaborated with the furniture designer Louis Majorelle, whose home and workshops were in Nancy. Another feature of Art Nouveau was the use of stained glass windows with that style of floral themes in residential salons, particularly in the Art Nouveau houses in Nancy. Many were the work of Jacques Grüber, who made windows for the Villa Majorelle and other houses.

In Belgium, the leading firm was the glass factory of Val Saint Lambert, which created vases in organic and floral forms, many of them designed by Philippe Wolfers. Wolfers was noted particularly for creating works of symbolist glass, often with metal decoration attached. In Bohemia, then a region of the Austro-Hungarian Empire noted for crystal manufacture, the companies J. & L. Lobmeyr and Joh. Loetz Witwe also experimented with new colouring techniques, producing more vivid and richer colours. In Germany, experimentation was led by Karl Köpping, who used blown glass to create extremely delicate glasses in the form of flowers; so delicate that few survive today.

In Vienna, the glass designs of the Secession movement were much more geometrical than those of France or Belgium; Otto Prutscher was the most rigorous glass designer of the movement. In Britain, a number of floral stained glass designs were created by Margaret Macdonald Mackintosh for the architectural display called "The House of an Art Lover".

In the United States, Louis Comfort Tiffany and his designers became particularly famous for their lamps, whose glass shades used common floral themes intricately pieced together. Tiffany lamps gained popularity after the World's Columbian Exposition in Chicago in 1893, where Tiffany displayed his lamps in a Byzantine-like chapel. Tiffany experimented extensively with the processes of colouring glass, patenting in 1894 the process Favrile glass, which used metallic oxides to colour the interior of the molten glass, giving it an iridescent effect. His workshops produced several different series of the Tiffany lamp in different floral designs, along with stained glass windows, screens, vases and a range of decorative objects. His works were first imported to Germany, then to France by Siegfried Bing, and then became one of the decorative sensations of the 1900 Exposition. An American rival to Tiffany, Steuben Glass, was founded in 1903 in Corning, NY, by Frederick Carder, who, like Tiffany, used the Fevrile process to create surfaces with iridescent colours. Another notable American glass artist was John La Farge, who created intricate and colourful stained glass windows on both religious and purely decorative themes.

Examples of stained glass windows in churches can be found in the Art Nouveau religious buildings article.

Metal art

The 19th-century architectural theorist Viollet-le-Duc had advocated showing, rather than concealing the iron frameworks of modern buildings, but Art Nouveau architects Victor Horta and Hector Guimard went a step further: they added iron decoration in curves inspired by floral and vegetal forms both in the interiors and exteriors of their buildings. They took the form of stairway railings in the interior, light fixtures, and other details in the interior, and balconies and other ornaments on the exterior. These became some of the most distinctive features of Art Nouveau architecture. The use of metal decoration in vegetal forms soon also appeared in silverware, lamps, and other decorative items.

In the United States, the designer George Grant Elmslie made extremely intricate cast iron designs for the balustrades and other interior decoration of the buildings of Chicago architect Louis Sullivan.

While French and American designers used floral and vegetal forms, Joseph Maria Olbrich and the other Secession artists designed teapots and other metal objects in a more geometric and sober style.

Jewellery

Art Nouveau jewellery's characteristics include subtle curves and lines. Its design often features natural objects including flowers, animals or birds. The female body is also popular often appearing on cameos. It frequently included long necklaces made of pearls or sterling-silver chains punctuated by glass beads or ending in a silver or gold pendant, itself often designed as an ornament to hold a single, faceted jewel of amethyst, peridot, or citrine.

The Art Nouveau period brought a notable stylistic revolution to the jewellery industry, led largely by the major firms in Paris. For the previous two centuries, the emphasis in fine jewellery had been creating dramatic settings for diamonds. During the reign of Art Nouveau, diamonds usually played a supporting role. Jewellers experimented with a wide variety of other stones, including agate, garnet, opal, moonstone, aquamarine and other semi-precious stones, and with a wide variety of new techniques, among others enamelling, and new materials, including horn, moulded glass, and ivory.

Early notable Paris jewellers in the Art Nouveau style included Louis Aucoc, whose family jewellery firm dated to 1821. The most famous designer of the Art Nouveau period, René Lalique, served his apprenticeship in the Aucoc studio from 1874 to 1876. Lalique became a central figure of Art Nouveau jewellery and glass, using nature, from dragonflies to grasses, as his models.  Artists from outside of the traditional world of jewellery, such as Paul Follot, best known as a furniture designer, experimented with jewellery designs. Other notable French Art Nouveau jewellery designers included Jules Brateau and Georges Henry. In the United States, the most famous designer was Louis Comfort Tiffany, whose work was shown at the shop of Siegfried Bing and also at the 1900 Paris Exposition.

In Britain, the most prominent figure was the Liberty & Co. & Cymric designer Archibald Knox, who made a variety of Art Nouveau pieces, including silver belt buckles. C. R. Ashbee designed pendants in the shapes of peacocks. The versatile Glasgow designer Charles Rennie Mackintosh also made jewellery, using traditional Celtic symbols. In Germany, the centre for Jugendstil jewellery was the city of Pforzheim, where most of the German firms, including Theodor Fahrner, were located. They quickly produced works to meet the demand for the new style.

Architecture and ornamentation

Art Nouveau architecture was a reaction against the eclectic styles that dominated European architecture in the second half of the 19th century. It was expressed through decoration: either ornamental (based on flowers and plants, e.g. thistles, irises, cyclamens, orchids, water lilies etc.) or sculptural (see the respective section below). While faces of people (or mascarons) are referred to ornament, the use of people in different forms of sculpture (statues and reliefs: see the respective section below) was also common in some forms of Art Nouveau. Before Vienna Secession, Jugendstil and the various forms of the National romantic style façades were asymmetrical, and often decorated with polychrome ceramic tiles. The decoration usually suggested movement; there was no distinction between the structure and the ornament. A curling or "whiplash" motif, based on the forms of plants and flowers, was widely used in the early Art Nouveau, but decoration became more abstract and symmetrical in Vienna Secession and other later versions of the style, as in the Stoclet Palace in Brussels (1905–1911).

The style first appeared in Brussels' Hankar House by Paul Hankar (1893) and Hôtel Tassel (1892–93) of Victor Horta. The Hôtel Tassel was visited by Hector Guimard, who used the same style in his first major work, the Castel Béranger (1897–98). Horta and Guimard also designed the furniture and the interior decoration, down to the doorknobs and carpeting. In 1899, based on the fame of the Castel Béranger, Guimard received a commission to design the entrances of the stations of the new Paris Métro, which opened in 1900. Though few of the originals survived, these became the symbol of the Art Nouveau movement in Paris.

In Paris, the architectural style was also a reaction to the strict regulations imposed on building facades by Georges-Eugène Haussmann, the prefect of Paris under Napoleon III. Bow windows were finally allowed in 1903, and Art Nouveau architects went to the opposite extreme, most notably in the houses of Jules Lavirotte, which were essentially large works of sculpture, completely covered with decoration. An important neighbourhood of Art Nouveau houses appeared in the French city of Nancy, around the Villa Majorelle (1901–02), the residence of the furniture designer Louis Majorelle. It was designed by Henri Sauvage as a showcase for Majorelle's furniture designs.

Many Art Nouveau buildings were included in UNESCO World Cultural Heritage list as a part of their city centres (in Bern, Budapest, Lviv, Paris, Porto, Prague, Riga, Saint Petersburg, Strasbourg (Neustadt), Vienna). Along with them, there were buildings that were included in the list as separate objects:

 : the works of Victor Horta (Hôtel Tassel, Hôtel Solvay, Hôtel van Eetvelde, Maison and Atelier Horta) and the Stoclet Palace by Josef Hoffmann in Brussels;
 : the works of Lluís Domènech i Montaner (Palau de la Música Catalana and Hospital de Sant Pau in Barcelona), and the works of Antoni Gaudí (Park Güell, Palau Güell, Sagrada Família, Casa Batlló, Casa Milá, Casa Vicens in Barcelona; Colònia Güell in Santa Coloma de Cervelló).

Sculpture

Sculpture was another form of expression for Art Nouveau artists, crossing with ceramics sometimes. The porcelain figurine Dancer with a Scarf by Agathon Léonard won recognition both in ceramics and in sculpture at the Paris Exposition in 1900. Sculptors of other countries also created ceramic sculptures: Bohemian Stanislav Sucharda and Ladislav Šaloun, Belgian Charles Van der Stappen and Catalan , who created statues of polychrome terracotta. Another notable sculptor of that time was Agustí Querol Subirats from Catalonia who created statues in Spain, Mexico, Argentina, and Cuba.

In architectural sculpture not only statues but also reliefs were used. Art Nouveau architects and sculptors found inspiration in animal motifs (butterflies, peacocks, swans, owls, bats, dragons, bears). Atlantes, caryatids, putti, and gargoyles were also used.

Furniture

Furniture design in the Art Nouveau period was closely associated with the architecture of the buildings; the architects often designed the furniture, carpets, light fixtures, doorknobs, and other decorative details. The furniture was often complex and expensive; a fine finish, usually polished or varnished, was regarded as essential, and continental designs were usually very complex, with curving shapes that were expensive to make. It also had the drawback that the owner of the home could not change the furniture or add pieces in a different style without disrupting the entire effect of the room. For this reason, when Art Nouveau architecture went out of style, the style of furniture also largely disappeared.

In France, the centre for furniture design and manufacture was in Nancy, where two major designers, Émile Gallé and Louis Majorelle had their studios and workshops, and where the Alliance des industries d'art (later called the School of Nancy) had been founded in 1901. Both designers based on their structure and ornamentation on forms taken from nature, including flowers and insects, such as the dragonfly, a popular motif in Art Nouveau design. Gallé was particularly known for his use of marquetry in relief, in the form of landscapes or poetic themes. Majorelle was known for his use of exotic and expensive woods, and for attaching bronze sculpted in vegetal themes to his pieces of furniture. Both designers used machines for the first phases of manufacture, but all the pieces were finished by hand. Other notable furniture designers of the Nancy School included Eugène Vallin and Émile André; both were architects by training, and both designed furniture that resembled the furniture from Belgian designers such as Horta and Van de Velde, which had less decoration and followed more closely the curving plants and flowers. Other notable French designers included Henri Bellery-Desfontaines, who took his inspiration from the neo-Gothic styles of Viollet-le-Duc; and Georges de Feure, Eugène Gaillard, and Édouard Colonna, who worked together with art dealer Siegfried Bing to revitalize the French furniture industry with new themes. Their work was known for "abstract naturalism", its unity of straight and curved lines, and its rococo influence. The furniture of de Feure at the Bing pavilion won a gold medal at the 1900 Paris Exposition. The most unusual and picturesque French designer was François-Rupert Carabin, a sculptor by training, whose furniture featured sculpted nude female forms and symbolic animals, particularly cats, who combined Art Nouveau elements with Symbolism. Other influential Paris furniture designers were Charles Plumet, and Alexandre Charpentier. In many ways the old vocabulary and techniques of classic French 18th-century Rococo furniture were re-interpreted in a new style.

In Belgium, the pioneer architects of the Art Nouveau movement, Victor Horta and Henry van de Velde, designed furniture for their houses, using vigorous curving lines and a minimum of decoration.  The Belgian designer Gustave Serrurier-Bovy added more decoration, applying brass strips in curving forms. In the Netherlands, where the style was called Nieuwe Kunst or New Art, H. P. Berlag, Lion Cachet and Theodor Nieuwenhuis followed a different course, that of the English Arts and Crafts movement, with more geometric rational forms.

In Britain, the furniture of Charles Rennie Mackintosh was purely Arts and Crafts, austere and geometrical, with long straight lines and right angles and a minimum of decoration. Continental designs were much more elaborate, often using curved shapes both in the basic shapes of the piece, and in applied decorative motifs. In Germany, the furniture of Peter Behrens and the Jugendstil was largely rationalist, with geometric straight lines and some decoration attached to the surface. Their goal was exactly the opposite of French Art Nouveau; simplicity of structure and simplicity of materials, for furniture that could be inexpensive and easily mass-manufactured.  The same was true for the furniture of designers of the Wiener Werkstätte in Vienna, led by Otto Wagner, Josef Hoffmann, Josef Maria Olbrich and Koloman Moser. The furniture was geometric and had a minimum of decoration, though in style it often followed national historic precedent, particularly the Biedemeier style.

Italian and Spanish furniture design went off in their own direction. Carlo Bugatti in Italy designed the extraordinary Snail Chair, wood covered with painted parchment and copper, for the Turin International Exposition of 1902. In Spain, following the lead of Antoni Gaudí and the Modernismo movement, the furniture designer Gaspar Homar designed works that were inspired by natural forms with touches of Catalan historic styles.

In the United States, furniture design was more often inspired by the Arts and Crafts movement, or by historic American models, than by the Art Nouveau. One designer who did introduce Art Nouveau themes was Charles Rohlfs in Buffalo, New York, whose designs for American white oak furniture were influenced by motifs of Celtic Art and Gothic art, with touches of Art Nouveau in the metal trim applied to the pieces.

Ceramics

Ceramic art, including faience,  was another flourishing domain for Art Nouveau artists, in the English-speaking countries falling under the wider art pottery movement.  The last part of the 19th century saw many technological innovations in the manufacture of ceramics, particularly the development of high temperature (grand feu) ceramics with crystallised and matte glazes. At the same time, several lost techniques, such as sang de boeuf glaze, were rediscovered. Art Nouveau ceramics were also influenced by traditional and modern Japanese and Chinese ceramics, whose vegetal and floral motifs fitted well with the Art Nouveau style. In France, artists also rediscovered the traditional stoneware (grés) methods and reinvented them with new motifs.

Émile Gallé, in Nancy, created earthenware works in natural earth colors with naturalistic themes of plants and insects. Ceramics also found an important new use in architecture: Art Nouveau architects, Jules Lavirotte and Hector Guimard among them, began to decorate the façades of buildings with architectural ceramics, many of them made by the firm of Alexandre Bigot, giving them a distinct Art Nouveau sculptural look.

One of the pioneer French Art Nouveau ceramists was Ernest Chaplet, whose career in ceramics spanned thirty years. He began producing stoneware influenced by Japanese and Chinese prototypes. Beginning in 1886, he worked with painter Paul Gauguin on stoneware designs with applied figures, multiple handles, painted and partially glazed, and collaborated with sculptors Félix Bracquemond, Jules Dalou and Auguste Rodin. His works were acclaimed at the 1900 Exposition.

The major national ceramics firms had an important place at the 1900 Paris Exposition: the Manufacture nationale de Sèvres outside Paris; Nymphenburg, Meissen, Villeroy & Boch in Germany, and Doulton in Britain. Other leading French ceramists included Taxile Doat, Pierre-Adrien Dalpayrat, Edmond Lachenal,  and Auguste Delaherche.

In France, Art Nouveau ceramics sometimes crossed the line into sculpture. The porcelain figurine Dancer with a Scarf by Agathon Léonard, made for the Manufacture nationale de Sèvres, won recognition in both categories at the 1900 Paris Exposition.

The Zsolnay factory in Pécs, Hungary, was founded by Miklós Zsolnay (1800–1880) in 1853 and led by his son, Vilmos Zsolnay (1828–1900) with chief designer Tádé Sikorski (1852–1940) to produce stoneware and other ceramics. In 1893, Zsolnay introduced porcelain pieces made of eosin. He led the factory to worldwide recognition by demonstrating its innovative products at world fairs and international exhibitions, including the 1873 World Fair in Vienna, then at the 1878 World Fair in Paris, where Zsolnay received a Grand Prix. Frost-resisting Zsolnay building decorations were used in numerous buildings, specifically during the Art Nouveau movement.

Ceramic tiles were also a distinctive feature of Portuguese Arte Nova that continued the long azulejo tradition of the country.

Mosaics

Mosaics were used by many Art Nouveau artists of different movements, especially of Catalan Modernisme (Hospital de Sant Pau, Palau de la Música Catalana, Casa Lleó-Morera and many others). Antoni Gaudí invented a new technique in the treatment of materials called trencadís, which used waste ceramic pieces.

Colourful Maiolica tile in floral designs wee a distinctive feature of the Majolica House in Vienna by Otto Wagner, (1898) and of the buildings of the works of the Russian Abramtsevo Colony, especially those by Mikhail Vrubel.

Textiles and wallpaper

Textiles and wallpapers were an important vehicle of Art Nouveau from the beginning of the style, and an essential element of Art Nouveau interior design. In Britain, the textile designs of William Morris had helped launch the Arts and Crafts movement and then Art Nouveau. Many designs were created for the Liberty department store in London, which popularized the style throughout Europe. One such designer was the Silver Studio, which provided colourful stylized floral patterns. Other distinctive designs came from Glasgow School, and Margaret Macdonald Mackintosh. The Glasgow school introduced several distinctive motifs, including stylized eggs, geometric forms and the "Rose of Glasgow".

In France, a major contribution was made by designer Eugène Grasset who in 1896 published La Plante et ses applications ornamentales, suggesting Art Nouveau designs based on different flowers and plants. Many patterns were designed for and produced by for the major French textile manufacturers in Mulhouse, Lille and Lyon, by German and Belgian workshops. The German designer Hermann Obrist specialized in floral patterns, particularly the cyclamen and the "whiplash" style based on flower stems, which became a major motif of the style. The Belgian Henry van de Velde presented a textile work, La Veillée d'Anges, at the Salon La Libre Esthéthique in Brussels, inspired by the symbolism of Paul Gauguin and of the Nabis. In the Netherlands, textiles were often inspired by batik patterns from the Dutch colonies in the East Indies. Folk art also inspired the creation of tapestries, carpets, embroidery and textiles in Central Europe and Scandinavia, in the work of Gerhard Munthe and Frida Hansen in Norway. The Five Swans design of Otto Eckmann appeared in more than one hundred different versions. The Hungarian designer János Vaszary combined Art Nouveau elements with folkloric themes.

Museums
There are 4 types of museums featuring Art Nouveau heritage:
 Broad-scope museums (not specifically dedicated to Art Nouveau but with a large collection of items in this style). Art Nouveau monuments are italicised;
 House-museums of Art Nouveau artists (all but Alphonse Mucha museum are Art Nouveau monuments);
 Museums dedicated to local Art Nouveau movements (all are Art Nouveau monuments);
 Other Art Nouveau buildings with museum status or featuring a museum inside (not dedicated to local Art Nouveau movements/specific artists).

There are many other Art Nouveau buildings and structures that do not have museum status but can be officially visited for a fee or unofficially for free (e.g. railway stations, churches, cafes, restaurants, pubs, hotels, stores, offices, libraries, cemeteries, fountains as well as numerous apartment buildings that are still inhabited).

See also
 Aestheticism
 Art Nouveau in Milan
 Art Nouveau in Poland
 Art Nouveau religious buildings
 Belle Époque
 Fin de siècle
 Paris architecture of the Belle Époque
 Réseau Art Nouveau Network
 Secession (art)
 Second Industrial Revolution
 Timeline of Art Nouveau
 World Art Nouveau Day
 Art Deco

Notes

References

Bibliography

 Bony, Anne, L'Architecture Moderne, Paris, Larousse (2012) 
 
 
 
 Duncan, Alastair, Art Nouveau, World of Art, New York: Thames and Hudson, 1994. 
 
 Heller, Steven, and Seymour Chwast, Graphic Style from Victorian to Digital, new ed. New York: Harry N. Abrams, Inc., 2001. pp. 53–57.
 Huyges, René, L'Art et le monde moderne, Volume 1, Librarie Larousse, Paris, 1970
 
 
 
 
 Renault, Christophe and Lazé, Christophe, les Styles de l'architecture et du mobliier, Éditions Jean-Paul Gisserot, 2006 (in French). 
 
 
 
 
 Sterner, Gabriele, Art Nouveau, an Art of Transition: From Individualism to Mass Society, 1st English ed. (original title: Jugendstil: Kunstformen zwischen Individualismus und Massengesellschaft), translated by Frederick G. Peters and Diana S. Peters, publisher Woodbury, N.Y.: Barron's Educational Series, 1982.

Further reading
 Art Nouveau Grange Books, Rochester, England 2007 
 William Craft Brumfield. The Origins of Modernism in Russian Architecture (Berkeley: University of California Press, 1991) 
 Debora L. Silverman, Art Nouveau in Fin-de-siècle France: Politics, Psychology, and Style, 1992
 
 L'Art appliqué : le style moderne, revue internationale, Éditeur :  H. Laurens (Paris) 1903–04, Bibliothèque nationale de France
 Modern'style (Art Nouveau): Le Dictionnaire Pratique de Menuiserie – Ebénisterie – Charpente, Par J. Justin Storck, édition de 1900

External links

Art Nouveau Teaching resource on the Art Nouveau movement from the National Gallery of Art in Washington, D.C.
Réseau Art Nouveau Network, a European network of Art Nouveau cities
Art Nouveau European Route, a non-profit association for the international promotion and protection of Art Nouveau heritage
Europeana virtual exhibition of Art Nouveau

 
Art movements
Decorative arts
Modern art
Art movements in Europe
Belle Époque
19th century in the arts
20th century in the arts